The Texas Gospel Music Hall of Fame, created by the Texas Gospel Music Association, is a Hall of Fame dedicated exclusively to recognizing meaningful contributions by individuals and groups in all forms of gospel music.

Inductees
This is a list of those inducted into the Texas Gospel Music Association's: Texas Gospel Music Hall of Fame, listed alphabetically with the year of induction.

Individuals

 Duane Allen
 Robert S. Arnold
 Joe Atkinson
 J.R. Baxter
 Les Beasley
 Jim Brady
 Charles F. Brown
 Charlie Campbell
 Burl Carter
 Cynthia Clawson
 Wayne Christian
 Ike Davis
 Jack Davis
 Paul De La Torre
 Doc Dooley
 Curtis Elkins
 Jane Robin Ellis
 Tom & Marie Ellis
 Larry Ford
 James Fudge
 Lee Gann
 Marian Garner
 Larry Gatlin
 Rudy Gatlin
 Billy Grable
 Lee Owens Graves
 Art Greenhaw
 John Hall
 Martha & Neely Ham
 Johnnie High
 Lou Wills Hildreth
 Pat Hoffmaster
 Dallas Holm
 Arnold Hyles
 Kurt Kaiser
 Kate Laswell
 Merle Conn Longnecker
 Chris & Diane Machen
 Bill Mack
 Harold & Jean Marshall
 Roger McDuff
 Gary McSpadden
 Walt Mills
 Marvin Montgomery
 John & Eunice Morrison
 Easmon Napier
 W. B. Nowlin
 Jerry Oliver
 Glen Payne
 Guy Penrod
 John Points
 Cecil Pollock
 Larry Randall
 J. Howard & Helen Rogers
 “Smilin” Joe Roper
 Billie Rothfus
 David Sapp
 Larry Scott
 Glenn Sessions
 Marion Snider
 Frank Stamps
 Virgil O. Stamps
 Robert Sterling
 Jack Taylor
 Rod Treme
 Mickey Vaughn
 Glenn Wilson
 Jim Wesson
 A. B. (Pop) Wills
 Bob L. Wills
 Calvin & Lillie Wills
 Joe Willis

Groups

 The Inspirationals
 The Campbell Family (Houston)
 The Friendly Four Quartet
 The Galileans
 The Gatlin Family
 The original Chuck-wagon Gang
 The Singing Christians
 The Mercy River Boys
 Phillips Family
 Plainsmen Quartet
 The Rangers Quartet
 The Singing Wills Family
 The Stamps Quartet
 The Stamps-Baxter Quartet

In Memoriam

 Charlie Campbell 1938 – 2020
 Gary McSpadden 1943 – 2020
 Walt Mills 1938 – 2020 
 Lou Wills Hildreth   1928 – 2019
 Jean Marshall   1942 – 2018
 Kurt Kaiser   1935 – 2018
 Howard Hildreth  (The Wills Family)  1926 – 2018
 Les Beasley   1928 – 2018
 Paul DeLatorre   1942 – 2018
 Lillie Wills  (The Wills Family)  1928 – 2018

See also
 Southern gospel music
 Christian country music
 Contemporary Christian Music

References

External links
  https://www.tgmhf.org/

Gospel music awards
American music awards
Music halls of fame
Music
Awards established in 1971
Dollywood
Southern gospel performers
Garland, Texas
State halls of fame in the United States
Halls of fame in Texas